MotoAmerica is the organization that promotes the AMA Superbike Series since 2015.  Sanctioned by the American Motorcyclist Association (AMA) and the Fédération Internationale de Motocyclisme (FIM), it features six classes of road racing: Superbike, Stock 1000, Supersport, Twins Cup, Junior Cup, and Mini Cup. 

MotoAmerica's primary goal is to reinvigorate motorcycle road racing in North America and ultimately send its riders to the top-level international championships: MotoGP and World Superbike. The series is run by the KRAVE Group, a partnership led by three-time 500cc World Champion Wayne Rainey. The other three partners include energy sector investor and CEO Richard Varner, former vice president of motorsports operations at COTA and former managing director of Team Roberts in MotoGP Chuck Aksland, and executive director of the Petersen Automotive Museum Terry Karges.

History
The series crowned its first champions in 2015, led by Superbike Championship winner Cameron Beaubier. The other champions were Jake Gagne (Superstock 1000), J. D. Beach (Supersport), Joe Roberts (Superstock 600) and Gage McAllister (KTM RC 390 Cup).

The series consisted of nine rounds and 18 races in 2015 with the championship getting started at the Circuit of The Americas (COTA) in Austin, Texas, and ending at New Jersey Motorsports Park in  Millville, New Jersey. MotoAmerica shared three rounds of its series with Dorna properties MotoGP (Circuit of The Americas and Indianapolis Motor Speedway) and World Superbike (WeatherTech Raceway Laguna Seca).

In 2016 the series again operated over nine rounds despite the loss of the Indianapolis event. In 2015 MotoAmerica had run alongside the MotoGP at Indianapolis but this was dropped from the MotoGP calendar for 2016. There was an extra round in 2016 at New Jersey Motorsports Park, bringing the total back up to 9 rounds.

In 2017 it ran 10 events with a single round at New Jersey but additional rounds at Pittsburgh International Race Complex and Sonoma Raceway.

For the 2018 season, there were changes in classes. The Superstock 1000 class was dropped from the schedule, partly because there were now sufficient full Superbikes to fill a moderately sized grid (16-18 machines as opposed to as few as 9 in previous seasons) and the introduction of a relatively low cost, but still fast class. The Stock 1000 class differs from the Superstock 1000 class it replaced, by permitting very few modifications from the showroom specifications of the road-legal machines. Lights, indicators, stands, and mirrors must be removed and a race fairing may be fitted, but the use of expensive replacement engines and certain other parts is prohibited.

The Superstock 600 class was dropped, with its place on the program being taken by the new Twins Cup class. In contrast to the Stock 1000 series, this is a fairly open class where development and modifications are allowed with a great degree of freedom as long as a twin-cylinder machine is used.

The Junior Cup class was introduced as a replacement for the KTM RC 390 Cup. Encouraged by the success of the competitive series at the world championship level, this championship was introduced as a new entry-level class with an age restriction limiting competitors to 25 years old.

Following a third-place finish in the 2019 Superbike season, Garrett Gerloff left his MotoAmerica Superbike team to join World Superbike aboard a Yamaha for the GRT Yamaha WorldSBK Junior Team.

The 2020 season saw a third straight win for Cameron Beaubier and fifth overall championship in the Superbike classification in the top tier of American motorcycle racing, and he announced that he would be moving to the 2021 Moto2 World Championship with the American Racing Team.

The most successful riders include Doug Chandler, Scott Russell, Miguel Duhamel, Mat Mladin, Ben Spies, Josh Hayes and Cameron Beaubier. Five non-Americans have won the title: Englishman Reg Pridmore, Australians Mat Mladin and Troy Corser, Canadian Miguel Duhamel and Spaniard Toni Elías.

Preceding Competitions 

From 1976, the American Motorcycle Association has organized and supported motorcycle racing through a variety of Superbike organizations. A full description of this history is available on the MotoAmerica 101 website.

The competition began with sporadic inclusion in a variety of AMA racing events across the United States and offered an alternative to purpose built racing competitions. Following the start of Superbike competitions as a support class for AMA motorcycle road racing, namely AMA Formula One (the US based version of MotoGP racing), the production based race competition quickly became a popular competition format and spread across the world. In fact the first World Superbike title held in 1988 was won by a US competitor Fred Merkel.

During the 1970s and 1980s the competition between European and Japanese manufacturers reflected the same level of rivalry that took place in US Formula 1 and international Grand Grix racing. However, that began to change with the inclusion of Honda who also brought Freddie Spencer along as their featured rider. Ducati, BMW and Moto Guzzi dominated up to the 1980s with BMW, Suzuki and Kawasaki taking control in the first half of the 1980s. Honda's presence took time to bring returns, but they ultimately won five consecutive titles from 1984 until 1988 with Fred Merkel, Wayne Rainey and Bubba Shobert.

Parity, popularity and rivalries followed the series through the 1990s and often as a prelude to the more international rivalries across manufacturers as well as riders. Ducati, Honda, Kawasaki and Suzuki all won championships during this time and Harley-Davidson even joined the fray (though they never won a race). It also provided a proving ground for eventual World Champions Nicky Hayden and Ben Spies.

The competition was sold to Daytona Motorsports Group in 2007, but the financial downturn in 2008 caused a significant decrease in funding and popularity. After MotoAmerica took over the series in 2015, the competition has seen a dramatic resurgence with Yamaha taking the most championships with riders Josh Hayes, Josh Herrin, Garrett Gerloff, J.D. Beach and Cameron Beaubier.

Feeder classes to the premier Superbike competition are consistently referred to as Superstock, Stock 1000, Supersport, AMA Formula 1 and AMA Formula Xtreme competitions.

Classes and Records

Superbike 
MotoAmerica's premier race class, Superbike showcases the top road racers aboard top-of-the-line, highly modified motorcycles capable of speeds approaching 200 miles per hour. Engine configurations and minimum weight requirements are listed below:

 Over 750cc up to 1000cc, 4-stroke, 3- and 4-cylinder
 Over 850cc up to 1200cc, 4-stroke, 2-cylinder
 370.5 pounds
 Models: BMW S1000RR, Ducati Panigale V4 R, Honda CBR1000RR, Kawasaki Ninja ZX-10R, Suzuki GSX-R1000, Yamaha YZF-R1

Stock 1000 
A feeder class for Superbike, Stock 1000 gives MotoAmerica riders the opportunity to gain experience aboard 1,000cc motorcycles with an eye toward eventually moving up to Superbike. Engine configurations and minimum weight requirements are listed below:

 Over 750cc up to 1000cc, 4-stroke, 3- and 4-cylinder
 Over 850cc up to 1200cc, 4-stroke, 2-cylinder
 374 pounds
 Models: BMW S1000RR, Honda CBR1000RR, Kawasaki Ninja ZX-10R, Suzuki GSX-R1000, Yamaha YZF-R1

Supersport 
MotoAmerica's middleweight race class, Supersport features the series’ rising stars competing aboard production-based motorcycles. Engine configurations and minimum weight requirements are listed below:

 Over 400cc up to 600cc, 4-stroke, 4-cylinder
 Over 500cc up to 675cc, 4-stroke, 3-cylinder
 Over 600cc up to 750cc, 4-stroke, 2-cylinder
 354.2 pounds (2013-2021 Kawasaki ZX-6R (636) minimum weight: 363.8 pounds)
 Models: Kawasaki Ninja ZX-6R (636), Suzuki GSX-R600, Yamaha YZF-R6, Honda CBR600RR

Twins Cup 
Putting middleweight, twin-cylinder motorcycles in the spotlight, Twins Cup enables regional and club racers from around the country to step up to the MotoAmerica series and compete on a national level. Engine configurations and minimum weight requirements are listed below:

 Over 600cc up to 800cc, 4-stroke, 2-cylinder
 297.6 pounds
 Models: Kawasaki Ninja 650, Suzuki SV650, Yamaha FZ-07/MT-07, Aprilia RS 660, Ducati Monster 797, Yamaha YZF-R7

Junior Cup 
MotoAmerica's entry-level race class, Junior Cup features the series’ youngest riders competing aboard small-displacement, production-based motorcycles. Engine configurations requirements are listed below:

 Over 300cc up to 500cc, 4-stroke, 1- or 2-cylinder
 Models: KTM RC 390 R, Kawasaki Ninja 400R, Yamaha YZF-R3, Honda CBR500R

Champions

Superbike

Stock 1000 (Superstock 1000 2015-2017)

Supersport

Twins Cup (Superstock 600 2015-2017)

Junior Cup (KTM RC 390 Cup 2015-2017)

King Of The Baggers

References

External links
 

Motorcycle road racing series
Motorsport competitions in the United States